The Embassy of the State of Palestine in Peru is the higher diplomatic representation of the State of Palestine in Peru. The embassy is located in San Isidro, Lima.

Peru does not have a representation in Ramallah or any other city in Palestine, although former president Pedro Castillo announced the intention of the country to open an Embassy in 2022.

History
The first Palestinian representation in Peru opened in 1979 as the office of the Palestine Liberation Organization (PLO), which at the time had no diplomatic status. In 1998, it achieved the agreement to host the Special Delegation of the PLO, and in 2000, Javier Pérez de Cuéllar raised the level of the delegation with all the privileges granted to countries in embassies accredited in Peru, making the delegation a de facto embassy. Ollanta Humala later recognized the State of Palestine in 2011.

Ambassadors

See also
Palestine–Peru relations

References

Peru
Palestine
State of Palestine–Peru relations
Palestine